Ged Robinson (born 20 June 1983 in Wellington, New Zealand) is a rugby union footballer. His regular playing position is hooker.

Melbourne Rebels
In 2011, the Rebels first season in Super Rugby competition, Robinson played in every match. In 2012 he played 14 of a possible 16 games. He will leave the Rebels after the 2013 Super Rugby season to return to New Zealand and join ITM Cup side . He joins Rebels head coach Damien Hill and fellow Rebels players James O'Connor, Cooper Vuna, Gareth Delve, Nick Phipps, Nic Henderson, James King, Tim Davidson and Richard Kingi on the list of departing Rebels at the end of the 2013 season. His last game as a Rebels player was a home game against New Zealand franchise the Highlanders, a match that also turned out to be the last Rebels match for head coach Damien Hill and players James O'Connor, Cooper Vuna, Gareth Delve, Nick Phipps and Nic Henderson. In front of over 12,000 spectators, the Rebels overcame a 24-point half-time deficit to achieve a remarkable 38-37 come-from-behind victory over the Highlanders, ending Robinson's tenure as a Rebels player on a winning note.

Highlanders
Robinson left Australia and moved to the Highlanders for the start of the 2014 Super Rugby season, where he came once again under the mentorship of former Wellington coach, Jamie Joseph.

References

External links
Rebels profile
itsrugby.co.uk profile

Living people
1983 births
New Zealand rugby union players
Rugby union hookers
Rugby union players from Wellington City
Hurricanes (rugby union) players
Melbourne Rebels players
Wellington rugby union players
Manawatu rugby union players
Hawke's Bay rugby union players
Highlanders (rugby union) players
Expatriate rugby union players in Australia
Canterbury rugby union players
Crusaders (rugby union) players
New Zealand expatriate rugby union players